Criterion Summit, elevation about  above sea level, is a mountain pass in the U.S. state of Oregon that is traversed by U.S. Route 197.
A sign and viewpoint map mark the summit. The map shows peaks of the Cascade Range that are visible from this spot, from Broken Top on the southwest to Mount Adams on the northwest. The summit is near the historic unincorporated community of Criterion.

References

Mountain passes of Oregon
Transportation in Wasco County, Oregon
Landforms of Wasco County, Oregon